Măgești is a commune in Bihor County, Crișana, Romania with a population of 2,717 people. It is composed of seven villages: Butani (Rikosd), Cacuciu Nou (Nagykakucs), Dobricionești (Doborcsány), Gălășeni (Gálosháza), Josani (Krajnikfalva), Măgești and Ortiteag (Ürgeteg).

References

Communes in Bihor County
Localities in Crișana